Balanogastris kolae, the kola weevil, is a species of insect that feeds on kola nuts.

References 

Curculionidae